Kyaw Htoo (born 19 May 1994) is a footballer from Burma and a midfielder for Yangon United FC.

References

Kyaw Htoo Profile

External links
Yangon United

1994 births
Living people
Burmese footballers
Myanmar international footballers
Yangon United F.C. players
Association football midfielders